Armand Croizette (1766, Lyon - 21 January 1841, Versailles city) was a French librettiste and playwright.

Biography 
A dramaturge at the Théâtre du Vaudeville then at the Théâtre de l'Ambigu, his plays were performed on the most important Parisian stages of the 19th century, including the Théâtre des Variétés, and the Théâtre de la Gaité.

Works 
1797: Arlequin protégé par la fortune, ou le Riche du moment, comedy in 3 acts, in prose
1800: Maria, ou, La forêt de Limberg, drama in three acts in prose, with Hector Chaussier, Fleureau de Ligny and Armand-François Chateauvieux
1801: Le Masque tombé, ou le Bal de l'Opéra, comedy in 1 act, mingled with vaudevilles, with P.G.A. Bonel and Chateauvieux
1802: Les Aveugles de Franconville, opera in 1 act, with Chateauvieux
1802: Gille en deuil, opera in 1 act, with Marc-Antoine Désaugiers and Jacques-André Jacquelin
1803: L'Ivrogne et sa femme, comédie-parade in 1 act, mingled with vaudevilles, with Joseph Ernest Sutton de Clonard
1808: M. Dupinceau, ou le Peintre d'enseignes, facétie, with Antoine Simonnin
1819: La Pièce en perce, comedy in 1 act, mingled with vaudeville, with Edmond Crosnier and Chateauvieux

Bibliography 
 Wilhelm Fleischer, Dictionnaire de bibliographie Française: Ap - Bh, vol.2, 1812, (p. 4769)
 Mémoires de la Société historique et archéologique de l'arrondissement de Pontoise et du Vexin, vol.20-22, 1898, (p. 60)

References 

18th-century French dramatists and playwrights
19th-century French dramatists and playwrights
French opera librettists
Writers from Lyon
1766 births
1841 deaths